The Rifle Factory Ishapore (also known as Ishapore Arsenal) is an Indian state-owned arms manufacturing unit located at Ichhapur in the state of West Bengal.

History
The first arms manufacturing facility on the site was a gunpowder factory, which was started in 1787 by Tipu Sultan and began production in 1791, whilst a gun & carriage manufacturing facility was set up nearby in 1801.

In 1904, a rifle factory was established by the British at Ichhapur, anglicized as Ishapore, and began production of the Lee–Enfield rifle, which has continued- more or less- until the mid-1980s, and possibly the present. The factory also manufactured the Vickers-Berthier (VB) light machine gun, which was adopted in 1932 by the Indian Army and still remains in reserve use.

Military rifles manufactured at Ishapore 1949 and pre-1949 are stamped "GRI" on the buttsocket, referring to George Rex, Imperator (i.e. King George VI, last Emperor of India), whilst military rifles manufactured 1949 and post-1948 are stamped "RFI", which stands for Rifle Factory, Ishapore.

The .303 British calibre Short Magazine Lee–Enfield Mk III, the 7.62×51mm NATO calibre Ishapore 2A1 rifle and the 7.62mm NATO L1A1 Self-Loading Rifle were manufactured at the factory. It now manufactures the 5.56mm INSAS rifle assault rifle, Kalantak rifle, Ghatak rifle (7.62×39mm AKM-style assault rifle), 7.62 Sniper Rifles and Pistol Auto 9mm 1A for military and other firearms such as IOF .22 revolver, IOF .315 sporting rifle, IOF .30-06 sporting rifle and IOF .22 sporting rifle for civilian customers.

The factory was administered by the Ordnance Factory Board of India till 2021 when it was corporatised under the ownership of Advanced Weapons and Equipment India Limited.

References

External links
 Ordnance Factory Board of India website

Defence companies of India
Firearm manufacturers of India
Economy of West Bengal
Manufacturing companies established in 1904
Indian companies established in 1904